This article is about the particular significance of the year 1866 to Wales and its people.

Incumbents

Lord Lieutenant of Anglesey – Henry Paget, 2nd Marquess of Anglesey 
Lord Lieutenant of Brecknockshire – George Pratt, 2nd Marquess Camden (until 8 August) Charles Morgan, 1st Baron Tredegar (from 27 September)
Lord Lieutenant of Caernarvonshire – Sir Richard Williams-Bulkeley, 10th Baronet (until 14 September); Edward Douglas-Pennant, 1st Baron Penrhyn (from 14 September) 
Lord Lieutenant of Cardiganshire – Edward Pryse
Lord Lieutenant of Carmarthenshire – John Campbell, 2nd Earl Cawdor 
Lord Lieutenant of Denbighshire – Robert Myddelton Biddulph    
Lord Lieutenant of Flintshire – Sir Stephen Glynne, 9th Baronet 
Lord Lieutenant of Glamorgan – Christopher Rice Mansel Talbot 
Lord Lieutenant of Merionethshire – Edward Lloyd-Mostyn, 2nd Baron Mostyn
Lord Lieutenant of Monmouthshire – Benjamin Hall, 1st Baron Llanover
Lord Lieutenant of Montgomeryshire – Sudeley Hanbury-Tracy, 3rd Baron Sudeley
Lord Lieutenant of Pembrokeshire – William Edwardes, 3rd Baron Kensington
Lord Lieutenant of Radnorshire – John Walsh, 1st Baron Ormathwaite

Bishop of Bangor – James Colquhoun Campbell
Bishop of Llandaff – Alfred Ollivant 
Bishop of St Asaph – Thomas Vowler Short 
Bishop of St Davids – Connop Thirlwall

Events
5 February — Railway contractor Thomas Savin goes bankrupt, resulting in a temporary halt in the construction of the Aberystwith and Welsh Coast Railway.
31 March — The last public execution in Wales takes place as Robert Coe is hanged in Swansea.
1 May — Wrexham, Mold and Connah's Quay Railway opens to passengers.
July — Launch of Yr Australydd, a Welsh language Calvinistic Methodist newspaper, in Victoria (Australia), edited by William Meirion Evans and Theophilus Williams.
5 September — The Pembroke and Tenby Railway is extended for passengers to Whitland.
6 September — Six people are killed in a railway derailment near Criccieth.
September — The song Hen Wlad Fy Nhadau — later to become the official national anthem of Wales — is sung for the first time at the National Eisteddfod held at Chester.
17 October — First confirmed death from a cholera epidemic in Carnarvon.
Sir George Gilbert Scott begins work on the renovation of Bangor Cathedral.
The Baptist Union of Wales is established.
Whiteford Lighthouse on Gower, the only remaining large wave-swept cast-iron lighthouse built in the UK, is first lit.
Edward Gordon Douglas is created Baron Penrhyn.
December — The Talyllyn Railway officially opens.

Arts and literature

Awards
The National Eisteddfod of Wales is held at Chester in England.
The harpist William Frost is awarded a pedal harp by Pencerdd Gwalia

New books

English language
Rees Howell Gronow — Last Recollections

Welsh language
Richard Davies (Mynyddog) — Caneuon Mynyddog
Roger Edwards — Y Tri Brawd
William Rees (Gwilym Hiraethog) — Nodiadau ar yr Epistol at yr Hebreaid

Music
John Owen (Owain Alaw) — Gŵyl Gwalia
John Thomas (Pencerdd Gwalia) — The Bride of Neath Valley (cantata)
The Eryri music festival (Gwyl Gerddorol Eryri) is founded.

Sport
Cricket — Hawarden Park Cricket Club is founded, reputedly by William Ewart Gladstone.
Rugby football — First competitive game played in Wales, between college teams at Lampeter.

Births
13 January — Frank Hill, Wales international rugby captain (died 1927)
21 January — Sir Owen Cox, politician and businessman in Australia (died 1932)
22 March — Willie Thomas, Wales international rugby captain (died 1921)
1 April — Sir William Henry Hoare Vincent, diplomat (died 1941)
18 April — Frederick Llewellyn-Jones, lawyer and politician (died 1941)
20 April — Sir John Milsom Rees, laryngologist (died 1952)
30 May — John Gruffydd Moelwyn Hughes, poet and hymn-writer (died 1944)
5 August — Sir Edward Anwyl, Celtic scholar (died 1914)
7 August — Charles Granville Bruce, mountaineer (died 1939)
13 August - William Finney, cricketer (died 1927)
24 August — Caesar Jenkyns, footballer (died 1941)
4 October — Robert Jones (Trebor Aled), poet (died 1917)
12 October — James Ramsay MacDonald, politician (died 1937)
4 November — Sir David William Evans, lawyer, public servant and Wales international rugby player, (died 1926)
5 November — Daniel Protheroe, conductor and choirmaster (died 1934)
14 November — Tom Morgan Wales international rugby player (died 1899)
24 November — Alexander Bland, Wales international rugby player (died 1947)
4 December — Dai Lewis (died 1943), rugby union forward who played international rugby for Wales
10 December — Stanley L. Wood, illustrator (died 1928
15 December — William Williams, Wales national rugby union player (died 1945)
date unknown — David Delta Evans (Dewi Hiraddug), journalist, author, and Unitarian minister (died 1948)

Deaths
16 January — David Owen (Brutus), literary editor, 70
27 January — John Gibson, sculptor, 75
31 January — Owen Owen Roberts, physician, 73
29 March - , poet, 55
19 May — David Davis, Blaengwawr, industrialist, 69
31 August (approx) — Robert Jermain Thomas, missionary (murdered in Korea), 26
October — Evan Bevan, humorous writer, 42/43
16 October — Angharad Llwyd, antiquary, 86
27 October — William Rowlands, minister and author active in the USA
30 October — George Lort Phillips, MP for Pembrokeshire, 55 (injuries from a fall)
1 December (in London) — George Everest, surveyor and geographer, 76

References

 
Wales